Walnut Tree is a 2020 Kurdish- Iranian biographical war drama film directed by Mohammad Hossein Mahdavian and written by Ebrahim Amini and Hossein Hassani. it revolves around the Chemical bombing of Sardasht of 1987. The film screened for the first time at the 38th Fajr Film Festival and received 11 nominations. Mahdavian won a Crystal Simorgh for Best Director and Maadi won the Crystal Simorgh for Best Actor for his performance.

Plot

  
The film is based on a true story that in the summer of 1987, "Qader Molanpour" (Payman Maadi) lives happily with his pregnant wife and three children in a border village in Kurdistan until an Iraqi fighter drops his only remaining bomb on the village on his way back from the chemical bombing of Sardasht, injuring his family and villagers. Qader arrives in the village and takes his wife and children to the hospital. Qader's spouse, "Maryam" (Minoo Sharifi) is eight months pregnant and therefore not allowed to move, but her three children are being moved to other cities.

Qader tries hard to keep his three seven to eight- year-old children alive, but unfortunately lose them one by one due to the severe exposure. Qader hides their death from Maryam so that she can give birth to her child without grief. The baby is born, but Maryam dies during the delivery and Qader is now alone with a new born baby. The man could no longer endure the pain and finally explodes and screams at the doctor blaming him for his wife's death. He reproaches the doctor for not ending the pregnancy in favor of the mother's health. Qader buries Maryam beside his children beneath a walnut tree in his village. The doctor comes and reveals that Maryam herself was aware of the danger still insisted on giving birth.

The doctor also told Qader that Maryam had already been informed about the death of her children and sacrificed herself to gift her husband this baby. She had even decided on a name, "Zhina" meaning life before her death. Bursting into tears, Qader heads to the hospital to bring his wife's only gift back home but due to the improper condition of the hospital, new-born babies are transferred to other cities and Qader loses his last child in that chaos.

Years later, he is being asked to testify against the use of weapons of mass destruction of The Hague Netherlands city in Court and there he talks to her lost Zhina and wants her to hear his voice but no luck. Qader searches for Zhina everywhere until the last day of his life and finally dies in the snowy winter of 2016 without having a chance to see her.

Cast
 Payman Maadi as Qader
 Mina Sadati as Homa
 Minoo Sharifi as Maryam
 Mehran Modiri as Doctor Ahmad
 Zhina Zahedi as Qader's daughter
 Mahan Karimi as Qader's son
 Mahya Karimi as Qader's son
 Amirhossein Hashemi as Driver

Production
Mohammad Hossein Mahdavian:

Cinematography

For the visual space of the story, old  Negative and different cameras have been used for each time period.  For the 1987 scenes, A 16mm  camera Eclair was used. A 35mm camera was used for the 2005 sequences and a digital camera arri was used for the 2017 sequences.

Simultaneous use of three filming formats in a film project has occurred for the first time in Iranian cinema.

Show at festivals 

 Asia Pacific Screen Awards 2020
 Tallinn Black Nights Film Festival 2020
 Moscow International Film Festival 2021
 Shanghai International Film Festival 2021
 Barcelona Asian Film Festival 2021
 Dhaka International Film Festival 2021

Reception

Accolades

References

External links
 

2020 films
2020 drama films
Kurdish-language films
2020s Persian-language films
2020s pregnancy films
Iran–Iraq War films
Iranian drama films
2020 multilingual films
Iranian multilingual films